Phillip Kinono (born 10 December 1997) is a Marshallese swimmer. He competed in the men's 50 metre freestyle event at the 2020 Summer Olympics.

Competition record

Best Results

References

External links
 

1997 births
Living people
People from Majuro
Marshallese male swimmers
Swimmers at the 2020 Summer Olympics
Olympic swimmers of the Marshall Islands